is a novel by Jun'ichirō Tanizaki. It was serialized in publisher Hakubunkan's magazine Shin Seinen from October 1931 to November 1932.  Initially, it was planned to be serialized for one year, but it was interrupted at the twelfth installment because it had not been completed within the planned period. In the February 1933 issue of Shin Seinen,  Tanizaki wrote of completing the work but he ended it without writing significantly more. After some additions and revisions it was published as a novel by Chuokoronsha in October 1935. The book included a prologue written in Chinese by “Setyo Gyofu” (“Fisherman Setyo”, Tanizaki's own pseudonym), and a footnote by the novelist Masamune Shiratori.

Set in the Sengoku (“Warring States”) period, it depicts the life of a samurai warlord or daimyo with a perverse amorous life.

Synopsis
The narrator explains that the story is based on the memoirs of the nun Myōkaku, who was once in the service of the Lord of Musashi, and the lord’s former servant Dōami.

Hōshimaru, heir to the Lord of Musashi, is held hostage as a child in Oshika Castle, the seat of the neighbouring Lord Tsukuma Ikkansai. In 1549, when he is aged twelve, the castle is besieged by Yakushiji Danjō Masataka. Hōshimaru is not allowed to enter the battlefield, but observes the castle’s women cleaning and dressing the severed heads of the enemy samurai who have been killed. He is excited by the smile of a beautiful girl as she dresses a man’s head which is noseless, a so-called “woman-head” whose nose had been removed in the heat of the battle as a substitute for the entire head which would be retrieved later. He wishes to repeat the excitement, and secretly enters the enemy camp so he can claim a head and bring it back to the girl and make her smile again. In the camp, he kills Lord Masataka, but is only able to claim his nose. The Yakushiji leaders abandon the siege in fear that their lord’s ignominious fate will be revealed. Hōshimaru does not get his head and remains silent.

At fifteen, Hōshimaru comes of age and takes the name Terukatsu. He is Lord Ikkansai’s page, and starts to earn a reputation as a warrior. The beautiful Lady Kikyō, daughter of the slain Lord Masataka, marries Tsukuma Oribenoshō Norishige, who succeeds his father Lord Ikkansai. The purpose of the marriage is to reconcile the two families; however, Lady Kikyō wants to avenge her father’s humiliating but secret death, and arranges for her husband to be attacked by bow and arrow in order to sever his nose. Two attacks narrowly fail: in the first Norishige is injured with an arrow in his upper lip, disfiguring him and severely affecting his speech; and in the second he loses an ear. Terakatsu discovers her plan, and sexually fantasises about the smile on her face if Norishige were to lose his nose.

Norishige withdraws with his wife to the inner castle. Terakatsu, now aged eighteen, discovers a secret entrance to Lady Kikyō’s rooms under her toilet. He meets her and presents her with her father’s nose. To satisfy Lady Kikyō’s desire for revenge and Terakatsu’s lust, they conspire to sever her husband’s nose. They are successful, and become lovers.

Terakatsu returns to his father’s castle, separated from Lady Kikyō. Aged twenty-one, he marries the fourteen-year old Lady Shōsetstuin. He tries to teach her and her handmaidens how to “dress the heads” and demonstrates by placing his servant Dōami so that only his head is above the floor, and forcing him to impersonate a corpse. Terakatsu fantasizes about cutting off Dōami’s nose so he looks like a “woman-head”. However, Shōsetstuin cannot satisfy Terakatsu’s weird longings or replace Lady Kikyō.

Terakatsu succeeds his father as Lord of Musashi and attacks Norishige’s castle, intending to take his possessions and his wife. Norishige and Lady Kikyō are captured and confined for life but are drawn closer now her father has been avenged. She rejects Terakatsu, who subsequently “sought out new women, one after another, with whom to share his bizarre stimulus and revolting dissipation.”

Background
The Secret History of the Lord of Musashi was one of several  of Tanizaki’s works in “essay-fiction” between 1930 and 1950, combining experimentation and tradition, including Mōmoku Monogatari (A Blind Man’s Tale, 1931), Ashikari (The Reed Cutter, 1932), Shunkinsho (A Portrait of Shunkin, 1933), and Shōshō Shigemoto no haha (Captain Shigemoto's Mother, 1949–1950).

The narrative technique of The Secret History may have been inspired by Stendhal’s The Abbess of Castro, which Tanizaki translated into Japanese in 1928. Tanizaki had originally planned to write a long historical novel, and expressed a desire to include a portrayal of a real individual woman rather than one of the anonymous figures in traditional literature. 

In 1948 Tanizaki wrote that The Secret History of the Lord of Musashi was one of his favorite works. He spoke of writing a sequel, and an outline for it was found after his death.

Evaluation
The Secret History both supplements traditional Japanese histories and burlesques them, by outrageous exaggeration and by never questioning the veracity of the preposterous events uncovered.

In his commentary in the Chūkō bunko edition, Shoichi Saeki compares the narrative of this work with that of Alfred Hitchcock.

References

Bibliography

Notes

External links
Text of book  in Aozora Bunko 
Preface to the first publication as a novel, by Masamune Shiratori ] in Aozora Bunko 
Tanizaki Junichiro Memorial Museum 

Novels by Junichiro Tanizaki
1931 novels
Japanese serial novels
Category :Novels set in Japan
Category :Japanese-language literature
Sengoku period in fiction
Unfinished books
Alfred A. Knopf books
Works by Japanese writers
20th-century Japanese literature
Works originally published in Japanese magazines
Novels first published in serial form